Christian dietary laws vary between denominations. The general dietary restrictions specified for Christians in the New Testament are to "abstain from food sacrificed to idols, from blood, from meat of strangled animals". Some Christian denominations forbid certain foods during periods of fasting, which in some denominations may cover half the year and may exclude meat, fish, dairy products, and olive oil. Christians in the Catholic, Lutheran, Anglican, and Orthodox denominations traditionally observe Friday as a meat-free day (in mourning of the crucifixion of Jesus); many also fast and abstain from meat on Wednesday (in memory of the betrayal of Jesus). There are various fasting periods, notably the liturgical season of Lent. A number of Christian denominations disallow alcohol consumption, but all Christian churches condemn drunkenness.

In the New Testament 
The only dietary restrictions specified for Christians in the New Testament are to "abstain from food sacrificed to idols, from blood, from meat of strangled animals", teachings that the early Church Fathers, such as Clement of Alexandria and Origen, preached for believers to follow. Paul the Apostle recommended that Christians abstain from consuming food that had been offered to idols as it could cause "my brother to stumble" in his faith with God (cf. ).

Early Christianity 
The Council of Jerusalem instructed gentile Christians not to consume blood, food offered to idols, or the meat of strangled animals, since "the Law of Moses has been preached in every city from the earliest times and is read in the synagogues on every Sabbath." In Judaism, Jews are forbidden from consuming (amongst other things) any carnivores and omnivores, herbivores that are not ruminants, any ruminants that do not have split hooves, shellfish (including shrimps and lobsters), unscaled and finless fish, blood, food offered to idols, or the meat of living or strangled animals. The Seven Laws of Noah, which Jews believe gentiles must follow, also forbid consuming the meat of living animals.

Denominational views

Nicene Christianity 

In Nicene Christianity, including Catholicism, Eastern Orthodoxy, Lutheranism, Anglicanism, and Reformed Christianity, there exist no dietary restrictions regarding specific animals that cannot be eaten. This stems from Peter the Apostle's vision of a sheet with animals, described in the Bible, in Acts of the Apostles, Chapter 10, when Saint Peter was told that "what God hath made clean, that call not thou common".

The Seventh-day Adventist Church follows the Old Testament's Mosaic Law on dietary restrictions, which is also the basis for the Jewish dietary laws. They only eat meat of a herbivore with split hooves and birds without a crop and without webbed feet; they also do not eat shellfish of any kind, and they only eat fish with scales. Any other animal is considered unclean and not suitable for eating. All vegetables, fruits and nuts are allowed.

Oriental Orthodoxy 
In the Ethiopian Orthodox Church, an Oriental Orthodox Christian denomination, washing one's hands is required before and after consuming food. This is followed by prayer, in which Christians often pray to ask God to thank Him for and bless their food before consuming it at the time of eating meals, such as breakfast. Slaughtering animals for food is often done in Ethiopia with the trinitarian formula.

The Armenian Apostolic Church, as with other Oriental Orthodox Churches, have rituals that "display obvious links with shechitah, Jewish kosher slaughter." Another Oriental Orthodox Church, the Ethiopian Orthodox Church, maintains Old Testament dietary restrictions.

Meat

Method of slaughter 
With reference to medieval times, Jillian Williams states that "unlike the Jewish and Muslims methods of animal slaughter, which require the draining of the animal's blood, Christian slaughter practices did not usually specify the method of slaughter" though "the Christian method of preparation largely mirrored the slaughter methods of Jews and Muslims for large animals". "The Christian methods of slaughter follow the Jewish way of draining the blood of the animal". David Grumett and Rachel Muers state that the Orthodox Christian Shechitah and Jewish Kosher methods of slaughter differ from the Muslim Halal (Dhabh) method in that they require the cut to "sever trachea, oesophagus and the jugular veins" as this method is believed to produce meat with minimal suffering to the animal.

Jhatka and Christianity 
According to Sikhism, Jhatka meat is meat from an animal that has been killed by a single strike of a sword or axe to sever the head, as opposed to ritualistically slow slaughter (kutha) like the Jewish slaughter (shechita) or Islamic slaughter (dhabihah). It is the method preferred by many Hindus, Sikhs, and Christians.

The jhatka method of slaughtering animals for food (with a single strike to minimize pain) is preferred by many Christians, although the Armenian Apostolic Church, among other Orthodox Christians, have rituals that "display obvious links with shechitah, Jewish kosher slaughter."

Vegetarianism 

Some Christian monks, such as the Trappists, have adopted a vegetarian policy of abstinence from eating meat.

Alcohol 

Most Christian denominations condone moderate drinking of alcohol, including the Anglicans, Catholics, Presbyterians, Lutherans, Reformed and the Orthodox. The Adventist, Baptist, Methodist, Mormon, and Pentecostal traditions either encourage abstinence from or prohibit the consumption of alcohol (cf. teetotalism).  In any case, all Christian churches, following various Biblical passages, condemn drunkenness as sinful (cf. ).

See also

References

External links
The Christian Vegetarian Association 
Outline of Dietary Laws in the Orthodox Catholic Church

Religion-based diets
Christian practices
Christian belief and doctrine
Animals in Christianity
Christian cuisine